A referendum concerning introducing prohibition in New South Wales was put to voters on 1 September 1928.

Background

Although 6 o'clock closing was introduced as a temporary measure, the government brought in extensions and discussed putting the matter to a referendum. In 1923, however, without testing the matter by a popular vote, the Fuller Nationalist government enacted 6 pm as the closing time.

The question
The question to be voted on was whether "prohibition, with compensation, shall come into force throughout New South Wales".

Results
The referendum overwhelmingly rejected the introduction of prohibition.

Aftermath

This was the second of 5 referendums concerning the sale of alcohol in New South Wales, 3 of which dealt with the closing hour for licensed premises and clubs while the fifth concerned Sunday trading.

See also 
 Referendums in New South Wales
 Referendums in Australia

References

1928 referendums
Referendums in New South Wales
September 1928 events
1920s in New South Wales
Alcohol law
Alcohol in Australia